Bussy-le-Repos is the name of the following communes in France:

 Bussy-le-Repos, Marne, in the Marne department
 Bussy-le-Repos, Yonne, in the Yonne department

See also
Bussy (disambiguation)